Elliot Rappaport is an electrical engineer at Electro Technology Consultants in Coconut Creek, Florida. He was named a Fellow of the Institute of Electrical and Electronics Engineers (IEEE) in 2012 for his contributions to grounding in industrial and commercial power systems.

References

Fellow Members of the IEEE
Living people
Year of birth missing (living people)
Place of birth missing (living people)
American electrical engineers